Anse de Mai is a fishing village in the northeast of Dominica, located between the towns of Calibishie and Portsmouth.  In 2013 Atlantique View Resort & Spa opened in Anse de Mai.  

Populated places in Dominica
Saint Andrew Parish, Dominica